Malia or Mallia is a coastal town and a former municipality in the northeast corner of the Heraklion regional unit in Crete, Greece. Since the 2011 local government reforms it is part of the municipality of Hersonissos, of which it is a municipal unit. The town (pop. 3,224 in 2011) was the seat of the municipality of Mália (pop. 5,433). The town is a tourist attraction, primarily for its significant archaeological site and nightlife. The original name for the town is not known.

History
The palace of Malia, dating from the Middle Bronze Age, was destroyed by an earthquake during the Late Bronze Age; Knossos and other sites were also destroyed at that time. The palace was later rebuilt toward the end of the Late Bronze Age. Most of the ruins visible today date from this second period of construction. The palace features a giant central courtyard, 48m x 23m in size. On the south side are two sets of steps leading upwards and a maze of tiny rooms. Also here is a strange carved stone called a kernos stone, which looks like a millstone with a cup attached to the side of it. On the north side of the courtyard were storage rooms with giant earthenware pithos jars, up to two metres tall. These were used for holding grain, olive oil and other liquids; the floor of these rooms has a complex drainage system for carrying away spilled liquids.

The palace of Malia was discovered in 1915 by Joseph Hadzidakis, a Greek archaeologist. It was fully excavated from 1922 onwards by the French School at Athens in collaboration with Greek scholars. In 1921 the French School of Athens was invited to continue its work, where under the direction of Jean Charbonneaux 1930 Central Court was exposed.
After the First World War, the excavations were continued under the direction of Fernand Chapouthier and Pierre Demargne and they uncovered the palace, and dug the surrounding residential neighborhood. Only after the 2nd World War in the 50s Micheline and Henri van Effenterre made the excavations at the "Crypt" and "Agora", Andre Dessene and Olivier Pelon on Quartier E, and Jean-Claude PourSat (from 1965) on important "Quartier Mu ". 1981, Pascal and Claude Darcque Bourrain further investigated the NO corner of the palace. The  soundings in the years 1981 and 1982, conducted by Olivier Pelon have brought new insights into the precursors of the palace. Since 1988, the excavations of Alexandre Farnoux and Jan Driessen have been continued.

The Palace of Malia has a floor area of 7,500 m2 and is oriented as all Minoan palaces to NS. With regard to design and equipment, it is smaller and more modest (rustic) compared to Knossos and Phaestos.

Several features stand out and immediately catch the eye, which distinguishes the "Palace of Malia" from all the others and identifies it: the 8 kouloures or silos in the SW corner, the oblique building in the north court  and the altar in the Central Court.

Around this Central Court the district or ensembles are arranged, whose communication was made possible through corridors and routes.
Each of these quarters has been assigned a specific function, but each of these chamber ensembles should be considered on its own, before it is placed in the overall plan.
Olivier Pelon differentiated 4 functional areas: representative, residential, cultic-religious and economic (Magazine)

From the Central Court, the rooms were centrifugally arranged. Thereby the typical projections and recesses of the Minoan Palace façades arise.
The façade was given a different meaning:

(>) Undoubtedly, the west façade is the most important in Malia.
In the center, it consists of carefully hewn cuboid blocks of sandstone, which are built on a base along the entire width. (Ashlar masonry) At edges with limestone blocks. They represent more than anything else the typical characteristics of Minoan façades, a series of pre- and recessed walls.

(>) The west façade is preceded by a large courtyard, the West Court. (100 m long and 20 m wide). Pelon constitutes a transition zone of settlement and palace, between civil and political, between the profane and the religious areas. Originally, the whole West Court was created as Kalderim, moreover, it is traversed by 1.05 m wide limestone plates
This way, the "raised walks" are often used as processional paths, dubbed, but generally seem to lead to the main points of the building.
The West Court is bounded on the north and south with interesting complexes:
in the north by the much discussed ensemble, "Hypostyle Crypt" an escape to space, which is connected underground with a number of magazine spaces whose floors are stuccoed, provided with gutter and sump. The excavator Henri van Effenterre supposed therein a gathering of 2 councils, the elderly and the young, who reigned over the city at the time of the first palaces.
In the south, large storage rooms were partially exposed that were not architecturally connected to the palace, but apparently had a close relationship in the Protopalatial time. Some of these rooms still contain numerous Pithoi.

→1) Date:
By soundings following dating has revealed:
1. There is a core of EMIII-MMIA (mid 3rd millennium/ 2300–1900 BCE), i.e. there is a period prepalatiale taken along the west façade (Quarter I) but also in the north of the Central Court (Quartier IX)
2. The construction of the first palace building in the Old Palaces MMIB-MMII (1900–1700) has an area of analog New Palaces Period.
3. In the New Palace Period there is a succession of two major phases (in MMIII and LMIA 1700–1450 BCE.
The first palace was in MMIB – MMII c. 1900 BCE built, which was probably destroyed by an earthquake in 1700 BCE.
During this time, we will find an urban center with settlements, the palace, villas, workshops and cemeteries. From this stage – by the soundings lately – unfortunately, very little is visible in the palace (Schedule I).
But the northwest surrounding the palace building complexes as "Hypostyle Crypt", "Agora" and the "Quartier Mu" demonstrate the "political center" at this time.
The New Palace, whose ruins are still visible today, was built in MMIII about 1650 BCE. And at about 1450 BCE in LMIA, finally destroyed as Phaestos, Zakros. Most likely, the volcanic eruption of Thera is to be regarded as the cause or the subsequent earthquake or a parallel invasion of Mycenaeans from mainland.
Importantly, the palace was surrounded by a Minoan town which has only recently been uncovered. Excavation is ongoing. Important parts of the old and new excavations are covered by a series of large semi-transparent roofs, which protect them from the elements. In places tourists are allowed to wander among the ruins; in others, walkways allow passage above. There are rooms which have been identified as metal workshops, ceramic workshops and meeting rooms; there is also a large residential dwelling with en-suite bath, which is similar to a design at Phaistos, both taking advantage of expansive views.

Malia resort
Modern day Malia is a holiday resort. Tourism and commerce are the main economic activities in the town, with hotels, restaurants, gift shops, bars and nightclubs. Malia has become one of the most popular tourist locations of Crete, and one of the most popular in Europe, rivalling Ibiza and Magaluf. It is mainly visited by young people from the United Kingdom and Northern Europe. The prominence of Malia as one of the leading spots for nightlife in Europe is cemented by the attraction of big name DJs and events.  The Main Strip is home to many bars, clubs, taverns and restaurants. This is supported by the many close by hotels and apartments in Malia and the immediate area. 
Malia has a fine sandy beach which starts from the bottom of the strip and continues towards the East near to the Minoan palace of Malia.

In the past, Malia town was well known for its agricultural products and its windmills. Today it is known for its crystal clear waters and its sandy beaches as well as its Minoan Palace of king Sarpidon, one of the three greatest Minoan palaces of Crete. The town of Malia is a well-known tourist destination that combines tradition with modern. These two different aspects of the town are separated by the main road, south of it is the old town with the picturesque alleyways built based on the traditional way and south of it, the new part of the town, full of countless bars and clubs where every visitor will enjoy the nightlife. The visitor, wandering in the alleyways of the old town, will admire traditional buildings (newly renovated with the help of locals and sarpidonistas volunteers), churches (some of them is dated back at Venetian age) and can also visit the traditional taverns and restaurants. In the new part of the town, visitors during the day can shop, but also can enjoy the nightlife, either on one of the numerous cafes or at the restaurants with traditional cuisine.

Malia was also the setting for 2011 British comedy film The Inbetweeners Movie, in which the four main characters went on a lads' holiday. Through the years Malia has become increasingly popular, outgrowing other holiday resorts such as Ayia Napa and Zante. An independent review of booking numbers from many travel agents discovered that the resort of Malia looks to be the most popular among young adults of 2013.

Villages in Municipal Unit of Malia

Krasi village 
Krasi village is located 46.3 km southeast of Heraklion city and just 6 km south of Malia town, in the inland of Hersonissos Municipality at an altitude of 600 m. Its villagers are involved in agricultural production, in particular in olive growing and livestock, producing high quality olive oil and dairy products that every visitor can taste and purchase from local shops. A remarkable point of interest of the village is the square, with its three ancient plane trees that decorate the square and during the summer time offer plenty of shade for the traditional cafes, taverns and shops. On the south side of the village you can see the ‘‘Megalh Vrish- Ydragogio’’ fountain, that to this day provides endless water to the local agricultural irrigation system and for the wider area. The church of Metamorphosis Sotiros, in the village, is an ideal point to visit and admire the enviable frescoes and wooden carved temple inside. In conclusion, the archaeological site of the area is the ‘‘Protominoikos Tafos’’, a tomb that was discovered in 1929 by Spiridon Marinatos, and is dated before the Minoan era. Krasi has a long and magnificent tradition in music and dancers, which is maintained to this day, and this is the guarantee for every visitor to live an experience full of tradition, celebration with local delights and drinks.

Mochos village 
Mochos village is located 12 km south of Stalis village, on the mountain side 45 km southeast of Heraklion city, in the inland of Hersonissos Municipality at an altitude of 400 m. A traditional village; which preserves its 16th century architecture, with a magnificent village square. In the square, traditional cafes, taverns and a local grocery shop offer local dishes, drinks and agricultural products. Every year on the 15th of August, the celebration of Virgin Mary take place, and a vast number of people gather in her honour, to feast on traditional delights and drink to the sound of Cretan traditional music and dance till the early morning hours. A worthwhile visit to the Folklore Museum of Mochos, where a traditional Cretan house is presented as well as a number of tools and objects from old traditional occupations. A walk around the picturesque alleyways is a must, and will definitely make visitors feel the warm atmosphere of the village and the characteristic hospitality of locals well known for their music and multicultural heritage.

Stalis village 
Stalis village is located 31 km east of Heraklion city and 3 km east and of Hersonissos village and 3 km from Malia town. It is a resort by the sea with accommodation facilities, shops, and sightseeing not only on its coastline but also on the south hillside of its area. It is an ideal destination for families, due to its relaxing atmosphere satisfying number of fully organized and beautiful beaches as well as taverns, cafes and restaurants. It is a breath away from, the more intense, nightlife of Malia and Hersonissos that visitors may seek. Easy and fast access is one of the advantages of Stalis, to its accommodation facilities and beaches, with the characteristic example of Foinikas beach an outstanding crystal clear water beach, fully organized with courts and areas for tennis, volley and water sports. The picture of this particular beach closes with the Cretan palm trees that spread across its area. In conclusion, a must see experience is the Xwrodeion event that take place on the 12th of August in the courtyard of Agios Ioannis church, where visitors will see and admire Cretan traditional costumes, dances, music and the making of local traditional delights. The entrance is free for this event.

Points of interest in Malia

Minoan Palace of Malia 
This Minoan Palace is situated 3 km east of Malia town and is the third most significant known Minoan Palace after Knossos and Phaistos. It is known for its strategic port and for its characteristic large central courtyard, the centerpiece of the complex, the stairwells, the skylights, polythira, monumental façades and, on each side, rooms for specific functions.

Platanos and Fountains in Krasi 
Krasi village is located in the mountains and it is distanced of about 10 km from the main town of Malia. Its square is naturally decorated with three enormous plane trees; the one in the middle is the biggest of them all and is considered to be one of the oldest plane trees in the Mediterranean. Opposite the majestic trees, two spectacular fountains stand to impress the visitors, giving a spectacular picture for everyone.

References

External links

 Malia palaceHellenic Ministry of Culture and Sports
 Malia Palace   Well illustrated account of the Palace and the nearby Minoan town

Cities in ancient Crete
Aegean palaces of the Bronze Age
Minoan sites in Crete
Populated places in Heraklion (regional unit)